Morris Nettles (January 26, 1952 – January 24, 2017) was a Major League Baseball outfielder who played two seasons with the California Angels in the mid-1970s.

Nettles was drafted by the Angels in the second round of the 1970 Major League Baseball Draft out of Venice High School in Los Angeles, California. A speedy runner with good range in the outfield, he batted over .300 in the Angels' farm system to earn a roster spot with the Angels coming out of Spring training . He was demoted back to the triple A Salt Lake City Angels at the end of May with a .222 batting average, three extra base hits, seven runs scored and one stolen base.

Nettles batted .328 with 26 stolen bases and 69 runs scored for Salt Lake City to earn a second chance with the big league club. He made the most of his second chance, batting .292 with nineteen stolen bases and scoring twenty runs at the top of the Angels' batting order.

Nettles was handed the centerfield job heading into the  campaign, but lost it to Mickey Rivers a month into the season. Playing one of the corner outfield positions and occasionally filling in for Rivers in center the rest of the way, Nettles batted .231 with fifty runs scored. He stole 22 bases, but was caught fifteen times. He and Jim Spencer were traded to the Chicago White Sox for Bill Melton and Steve Dunning on December 11, 1975.

Nettles was one of many young outfielders competing for the White Sox's centerfield job in Spring training . With Chet Lemon eventually named the Chisox's centerfielder, Nettles split the season between the Toledo Mud Hens and Iowa Oaks, batting a combined .232 in his final professional season.

Nettles died from complications of pancreatic cancer on January 24, 2017.

References

External links

1952 births
2017 deaths
African-American baseball players
Major League Baseball outfielders
California Angels players
Baseball players from Los Angeles
Águilas Cibaeñas players
American expatriate baseball players in the Dominican Republic
Deaths from cancer in California
Deaths from pancreatic cancer
20th-century African-American sportspeople
21st-century African-American people
Angeles de Puebla players
American expatriate baseball players in Mexico
Dorados de Chihuahua players
El Paso Sun Kings players
Idaho Falls Angels players
Iowa Oaks players
Piratas de Campeche players
Plataneros de Tabasco players
Quad Cities Angels players
Salt Lake City Angels players
Shreveport Captains players
Toledo Mud Hens players
Venice High School (Los Angeles) alumni